Pierre-Henri Dumont (born 7 October 1987) is a French politician for the Republicans party (French language: Les Républicains), who has been serving as a member of the National Assembly since June 2017, representing the Pas-de-Calais's 7th constituency. His constituency contains the port city of Calais.

Political career 
Dumont served as Mayor of Marck from 2014 to 2017.

Dumont was elected to the French Parliament in 2017, defeating National Rally Member of the European Parliament, Philippe Olivier in the second round. In parliament, he serves on the Committee on Foreign Affairs and the Committee on European Affairs. Since 2019, he has also been a member of the German delegation to the Franco-German Parliamentary Assembly.

Political positions
In the summer of 2020, Dumont disputed the claims of Priti Patel, the British Home Secretary that French authorities were not stopping migrants from leaving France and crossing the English Channel. Dumont blamed British law for the situation.

After the November 2021 English Channel disaster, he spoke to CNN and criticised Prime Minister Boris Johnson.

References

External links 
 

1987 births
Living people
Sciences Po alumni
People from Dunkirk
People from Calais
People from Pas-de-Calais
The Republicans (France) politicians
Politicians from Hauts-de-France
Deputies of the 15th National Assembly of the French Fifth Republic
Members of Parliament for Pas-de-Calais